The 2014 Valencia Open 500 was a men's tennis tournament played on indoor hard courts. It was the 20th edition of the Valencia Open, and part of the 500 Series of the 2014 ATP World Tour. It was held at the Ciutat de les Arts i les Ciències in Valencia, Spain, from 20 October through 26 October 2014. Third-seeded Andy Murray won the singles title.

Points and prize money

Point distribution

Prize money

Singles main-draw entrants

Seeds

 Rankings are as of October 13, 2014

Other entrants
The following players received wildcards into the singles main draw:
  Tomáš Berdych 
  Pablo Carreño Busta
  Stefan Kozlov
  Andy Murray

The following players received entry from the qualifying draw:
  Thomaz Bellucci
  Norbert Gomboš
  Malek Jaziri
  Albert Ramos

Withdrawals
Before the tournament
  Kei Nishikori
  Radek Štěpánek
  Marin Čilić
  Dmitry Tursunov
During the tournament
  Roberto Bautista Agut (abdominal injury)
  Martin Kližan (wrist injury)

Retirements
  Marcel Granollers (right abdominal injury)

Doubles main-draw entrants

Seeds

 Rankings are as of October 13, 2014

Other entrants
The following pairs received wildcards into the doubles main draw:
  Pablo Andújar /  Daniel Gimeno Traver
  Pablo Carreño Busta /  Guillermo García López
The following pair received entry from the qualifying draw::
  Austin Krajicek /  Nicholas Monroe
The following pairs received entry as alternates:
  Íñigo Cervantes /  Pere Riba

Withdrawals
  Marcel Granollers (right abdominal injury)

Finals

Singles

  Andy Murray  defeated  Tommy Robredo, 3–6, 7–6(9–7), 7–6(10–8)

Doubles

  Jean-Julien Rojer /  Horia Tecău defeated  Kevin Anderson /  Jérémy Chardy, 6–4, 6–2

References

External links
Official website